An oncology nurse is a specialized nurse who cares for cancer patients. These nurses require advanced certifications and clinical experiences in oncology further than the typical baccalaureate nursing program provides. Oncology nursing care can be defined as meeting the various needs of oncology patients during the time of their disease including appropriate screenings and other preventive practices, symptom management, care to retain as much normal functioning as possible, and supportive measures upon end of life.

Certification in the United States
The Oncology Nursing Certification Corporation (ONCC) offers several different options for board certification in oncological nursing.  Certification is a voluntary process and ensures that a nurse has proper qualifications and knowledge of a specialty area and has kept up-to-date in his or her education.

The ONCC offers eight options for certification:
 Basic:
 OCN: Oncology Certified Nurse
 CPON: Certified Pediatric Oncology Nurse
 CPHON: Certified Pediatric Hematology Oncology Nurse
 Specialty:
 BMTCN: Blood and Marrow Transplant Certified Nurse
 CBCN: Certified Breast Care Nurse
 Advanced:
 AOCN: Advanced Oncology Certified Nurse
 AOCNP: Advanced Oncology Certified Nurse Practitioner
 AOCNS: Advanced Oncology Certified Clinical Nurse Specialist

Certification is granted for four years, after which it must be renewed by taking a recertification test or by earning a certain number of continuing education credits.

To become certified, nurses must have an RN license, meet specific eligibility criteria for nursing experience and specialty practice, and must pass a multiple-choice test.

For the advanced AOCNP and AOCNS certifications, a nurse must have a master's degree or higher in nursing and a minimum of 500 hours of supervised clinical practice of oncology nursing.  The AOCNP certification also requires successful completion of an accredited nurse practitioner program.

Oncology Nursing in Morocco

Demand 
The demand for oncology nurses is enormous in Morocco. Statistics of the Moroccan Ministry of Health indicate that the death toll of malignant neoplasms mounts to 17 thousands a year. The number of patients with cancer is believed to be three-times the number of annual deaths. A recent study of the European Institute of Health Sciences (Institut Européen des Sciences de la Santé) projected that the need for oncology nurses in 2025 is estimated at 5 thousand nurses. Yet, the number of qualified oncology nurses in the country is equal to nil. The reason is obviously the absence of a formal educational program in oncology nursing.

Oncology nursing training in Morocco
Currently there currently exists only one educational program in oncology nursing that is being offered by the European Institute of Health Sciences. It has been approved by the Ministry of Higher Education as well as the Ministry of Health in 2014. The duration of this Bachelor of Science program in Oncology Nursing is 3 years and encompasses a total of 6 thousands hours, equivalent to 120 semester credits in the US educational system and 180 ECTS in the European system. The program attracts a large number of students from African countries.

Certification requirements in Morocco
In Morocco, there exists no system for certification of oncology nurses. However, graduates of the oncology nursing program of the European Institute of Health Sciences can set for certification exams abroad, particularly in European countries.

Roles

Oncology nurses, like any Registered Nurse have a large variety of settings they can work in. Oncology nurses can work inpatient settings such as hospitals, outpatient settings, in hospice services, or in physician offices. There are a variety of specialties such as radiation, surgery, pediatric, or gynecologic. Oncology nurses have advanced knowledge of assessing the client's status and from this assessment will help the multi-disciplinary medical team to develop a treatment plan.

Education

The nurse must also educate the patient on their condition, its side effects, its treatment plan, and how to prevent possible complications. This education should be done effectively throughout the treatment of the disease, according to the teaching style that best suits the particular patient. According to the Oncology Nursing Standards, the patient or caregivers for the patient should understand the state of the disease and the therapy used at their education level, understand the therapy schedule and when it is being used, be involved in decisions regarding their own care, and state interventions for serious side effects and complications of the disease and intervention.

Treatment

Nurses must be able to manage the many side effects associated with cancer and the treatment. Nurses must have extensive knowledge of pharmacological and nonpharmacological nursing interventions, and when they are appropriate to use.

Chemotherapy

Oncology nurses must have appropriate training in the administration, handling, side effects, and dosing of chemotherapy. Each institution will have its own policies for various chemotherapy drugs to ensure adequate training and for prevention of errors. The Oncology Nursing Society (ONS) and Oncology Nursing Certification Corporation (ONCC) offer a Chemotherapy/Biotherapy training course available to any oncology nurse to ensure the safe administration and management of side effects of chemotherapy and biotherapy agents. This course consists of 16 contact hours. This certification needs to be renewed after two years.

References

External links

Nursing specialties
Oncology
Health in Morocco